Stephanie Moore (born July 14, 1970) is a Canadian actress. She is best known for her roles on P2 as Lorraine (voice) and in the films Cube Zero, Angel Eyes, and John Q.

She was born in Ottawa, Ontario.

Filmography

Film

Television

External links

21st-century Canadian actresses
Canadian film actresses
Canadian television actresses
Living people
1970 births